Penlee Point may refer to one of three locations in Cornwall, United Kingdom:
 Penlee Point, Mousehole
 Penlee Point, Rame
 Penlee Quarry, served by Penlee Quarry railway c. 1900 – 1973